Anjena Kirti is an Indian actress and model, who predominantly works in the Tamil and Telugu film industries. Anjena was born and raised in Chennai, she was an international 

airline crew Etihad Airways. She left her airline crew job to pursue a career in acting.

Career
Debuting in 2014 Tamil comedy Azhagiya Pandipuram directed by N. Rayan as the lead, Anjena entered the Tamil film industry. However, the first film she shot for was Vetri Kondaan, a romantic thriller which failed to release. Her subsequent releases were Thiranthidu Seese (2015) with Sai Dhanshika and Anjena Kirti playing the female leads, followed by the film Andhadhi as Anjana. She was then in a children's 3D film shot entirely in Japan, Jambulingam 3D (2016), directed by Hari and Hareesh. Anjena then starred in Chennai 600028 II, directed by Venkat prabhu, where she played a north Indian girl paired opposite Vijay Vasanth. Her next release was Yaagan, where she paired opposite a theatre artist from Denmark, Sajan.  Yaagan was appreciated for the songs and lead artists performance followed by Vadacurry director Saravana Raja's RK Nagar, which released on Netflix 2019 Anjena plays a north Chennai girl named Kamatchi, This was further followed by a cameo in a web series Live Telecast on Disney+ Hotstar directed by director Venkat Prabhu Anjena later in 2021 played the Muslim bride Zarina Begum in the Superhit time loop Tamil film Maanaadu 2022 saw her in another cameo in the (2022) adult comedy Manmatha Leelai. Anjena Kirti now shoots for Tamil movies The Trainers which is under post production and Aram Sei the latter being a heroine centric film in her Career and has even appeared in a cameo role in Director Sundar.C's Coffee with Kadhal 
as actor Jai s ex-girlfriend.

Filmography
All films are in Tamil, unless otherwise noted.

Filmography / Webseries

References

External links 
 

Actresses in Tamil cinema
Female models from Chennai
21st-century Indian actresses
Living people
Year of birth missing (living people)
Actresses from Chennai
Indian film actresses